Chitinophaga aurantiaca is a Gram-negative, rod-shaped, facultatively anaerobic and non-motile bacterium from the genus of Chitinophaga.

References

Chitinophagia
Bacteria described in 2019